Kundur is a village in Herat Province, Afghanistan. It is one of the two Mogholi speaking villages left alongside Karez-i-Mulla.

References 

Populated places in Herat Province
Villages in Afghanistan